Beatriz Spelzini is an Argentinian actress. She has appeared in multiple films and television programs in Argentina as well as many European countries. Her film credits include  (2011), Yo la recuerdo ahora and The Cat Vanishes. Television appearances include La Nada Blanca and Donne assassine.

External links
 

Argentine film actresses
Argentine television actresses
Living people
20th-century Argentine actresses
21st-century Argentine actresses
Year of birth missing (living people)